Ralph Wilbur Moss (April 21, 1862 – April 26, 1919) was a U.S. Representative from Indiana.

Born in Center Point, Indiana, Moss was educated in the common schools of the township and attended Purdue University in West Lafayette, Indiana, for two years. He taught school in Sugar Ridge Township, and was principal of the graded schools in Harmony, Indiana. He subsequently became engaged in agricultural pursuits, and served as member of the Indiana State Senate from 1905 to 1909.

Moss was elected as a Democrat to the Sixty-first and to the three succeeding Congresses (March 4, 1909 – March 3, 1917). He served as chairman of the Committee on Expenditures in the Department of Agriculture (Sixty-second Congress). He was an unsuccessful candidate for reelection in 1916 to the Sixty-fifth Congress and for election in 1918 to the Sixty-sixth Congress.

He retired to his farm near Ashboro, Indiana, where he died from injuries sustained after he was attacked by a bull on his farm. He was interred in Moss Cemetery, near his home.

References

External links

1862 births
1919 deaths
People from Clay County, Indiana
Democratic Party Indiana state senators
Democratic Party members of the United States House of Representatives from Indiana
19th-century American politicians
Purdue University alumni
Educators from Indiana
Deaths due to bull attacks
Deaths due to animal attacks in the United States
Accidental deaths in Indiana